Cascade Plantation, also known as Willow Oaks, is a historic plantation house located near Eden, Rockingham County, North Carolina. It dates to the 1830s, and is a two-story, five bay by three bay, Federal style frame dwelling.  It sits on a brick basement and is sheathed in weatherboard.  It has pairs of brick exterior chimneys on each gable end.

Willow Oaks plantation was the home of Dan River Inc. founder and president Thomas Benton Fitzgerald from 1897 to 1916.

It was listed on the National Register of Historic Places in 1975.

References

Plantation houses in North Carolina
Houses on the National Register of Historic Places in North Carolina
Federal architecture in North Carolina
Houses in Rockingham County, North Carolina
National Register of Historic Places in Rockingham County, North Carolina